Aunby is a village in the parish of Careby Aunby and Holywell, in the South Kesteven district of Lincolnshire, England. It is situated north from Stamford on the B1176 road, and just south of Careby.

Aunby consists of Manor and Lodge farms, and a deserted medieval village.  The River Glen flows to the east of the village, next to the East Coast Main Line. Close to the west is Rutland.

References

External links

Villages in Lincolnshire
South Kesteven District